Athlone South, also called South Athlone, is a barony in County Roscommon, Republic of Ireland. Baronies were mainly cadastral rather than administrative units. They acquired modest local taxation and spending functions in the 19th century before being superseded by the Local Government (Ireland) Act 1898.

Etymology
Athlone South is named after Athlone town; it contains the western portion of the town, west of the River Shannon, although part of it (seven townlands) has been transferred to County Westmeath.

Geography
Athlone South is located in the south of County Roscommon, bounded by the River Shannon and Lough Ree to the east and the River Suck to the west.

History

It was originally a single barony with Athlone North; they were separated by 1868.

Athlone barony was anciently ruled by the Ó Ceallaigh (O'Kellys), princes of Uí Maine. The Ó Fallúin (O'Fallons) were also a powerful family. It was created from the early medieval cantred of Tyrmany (Tír Maine), and by 1585 it was known as O'Kelly's Country. By the 18th and 19th centuries, it was the seat of the Kellys, Mitchells and Cootes.

List of settlements

Below is a list of settlements in Athlone South:
Athlone (western part)
Bellanamullia
Brideswell
Cornafulla
Curraghboy
Dysart
Kiltoom
Lecarrow
Taghmaconnell

References

Baronies of County Roscommon